The men's pole vault event at the 2005 European Athletics U23 Championships was held in Erfurt, Germany, at Steigerwaldstadion on 14 and 16 July.

Medalists

Results

Final
16 July

Qualifications
14 July
Qualifying 5.40 or 12 best to the Final

Group A

Group B

Participation
According to an unofficial count, 22 athletes from 13 countries participated in the event.

 (2)
 (3)
 (3)
 (1)
 (1)
 (1)
 (1)
 (1)
 (1)
 (1)
 (3)
 (3)
 (1)

References

Pole vault
Pole vault at the European Athletics U23 Championships